Soliño is a Spanish surname. Notable people with the surname include:

María Soliño (1551–?), Spanish woman accused of witchcraft
María Amelia López Soliño (1911–2009), Spanish blogger
Norberto Soliño (1902–?), cinematographer and businessman

Spanish-language surnames